In enzymology, a trans-feruloyl—CoA synthase is an enzyme that catalyzes the chemical reaction

ferulic acid + CoASH + ATP  trans-feruloyl-CoA + products of ATP breakdown

The 3 substrates of this enzyme are ferulic acid, CoASH, and ATP, whereas its two products are trans-feruloyl-CoA and products of ATP breakdown.

This enzyme belongs to the family of ligases, specifically those forming carbon-sulfur bonds as acid-thiol ligases.  The systematic name of this enzyme class is trans-ferulate:CoASH ligase (ATP-hydrolysing). This enzyme is also called trans-feruloyl-CoA synthetase.

References

 
 

EC 6.2.1
Enzymes of unknown structure